The fulvous-faced scrub tyrant (Euscarthmus fulviceps) is a species of bird in the family Tyrannidae. It is found in Ecuador and Peru. Its natural habitats are dry savanna, subtropical or tropical dry shrubland, and subtropical or tropical high-altitude shrubland.

References

 Gill F, D Donsker & P Rasmussen  (Eds). 2022. IOC World Bird List (v12.1). doi :  10.14344/IOC.ML.12.1

fulvous-faced scrub tyrant
Birds of South America
fulvous-faced scrub tyrant
fulvous-faced scrub tyrant